Gazeta Românească was a newspaper from the Republic of Moldova, founded in 2001 by Valeriu Saharneanu.

References

External links 
 Romanian public television may host show about Moldova

Publications established in 2001
Romanian-language newspapers published in Moldova
Euronova Media Group
2001 establishments in Moldova